The Chrachenhorn (2,891 m) is a mountain of the Albula Alps, overlooking Monstein in the canton of Graubünden. It lies on the range between the Landwasser and the Ducanfurgga.

References

External links
 Chrachenhorn on Hikr

Mountains of Switzerland
Mountains of Graubünden
Mountains of the Alps
Two-thousanders of Switzerland
Davos